Dempsey is an extinct town in Bannock County, in the U.S. state of Idaho.

History
A post office called Dempsey was established in 1895, and remained in operation until 1915.  The community has the name of Bob Dempsey, an early settler.

References

Geography of Bannock County, Idaho
Ghost towns in Idaho